The surname Sample is most likely a version of the name Semple/Sempill, the Clan Sempill being a lowland Scottish clan originating near Glasgow, Scotland. Some members of the clan emigrated to northern Ireland and America.

Notable members of the family include:

Alexander Sample (born 1960), Catholic bishop in Michigan
Bill Sample (born 1946), member of the Arkansas Senate
Billy Sample (born 1955), former professional baseball player
Cameron Sample (born 1999), American football player
Drew Sample (born 1996), American football player
James Sample (1910–1995), American producer
Joe Sample (1939–2014), American jazz musician
Johnny Sample (1937–2005), former professional American football defensive back
Robert Sample (died 1718), North American pirate
Steven Sample, president of the University of Southern California
Tex Sample (born 1934), sociologist of religion
Tim Sample (born 1951), New England humorist
William Sample (1898–1945), Rear Admiral in the United States Navy

See also
Sampler (surname)
Samples (surname)